James Lutz (born March 31, 1998) is an American compound archer. He became world champion in the men's individual compound event at the 2019 World Archery Championships held in 's-Hertogenbosch, Netherlands. He is the fifth compound archer from the United States to become world champion in this event. In the final, he defeated Anders Faugstad of Norway.

In 2020, he finished in 26th place in the men's compound event at The Vegas Shoot held in Las Vegas, United States.

In 2021, he won the gold medal in the men's team event at the World Archery Championships held in Yankton, United States.

He represented the United States at the 2022 World Games held in Birmingham, Alabama, United States. He competed in the men's individual compound event.

References

External links 
 

Living people
1998 births
Place of birth missing (living people)
American male archers
World Archery Championships medalists
Competitors at the 2022 World Games
20th-century American people
21st-century American people